Mansi alphabets is a writing system used to write Mansi language. During its existence, it functioned on different graphic bases and was repeatedly reformed. At present day, the Mansi writing functions in Cyrillic. There are 3 stages in the history of Mansi writing:

 until the early 1930s, early attempts to create a written language based on the Cyrillic alphabet;
 1931–1937 - writing on the Latin basis;
 since 1937 - modern writing based on the Cyrillic alphabet.

History

Pre-revolutionary period 
Until the beginning of the 20th century, the Mansi did not have their own written language. Until the 1930s, hunters used the rudiments of picture writing, which made it possible to describe the size of prey and the circumstances of the hunt. The system for writing numbers was quite well developed. So, numbers from one to four were denoted by vertical sticks │, the number 5 - by an inclined stick ╱, 10 - by a cross ╳, 100 - by an asterisk ✳. For example ╳╳╳╳╱││ meant 47.

The oldest records of individual Mansi words (mainly proper names) in Russian documents date back to the 16th-17th centuries. In 1736, I. Kuroyedov, on behalf of Vasily Tatishchev, compiled the first “Dictionary of the Vogul language”. Later, other Mansi dictionaries appeared, both handwritten and printed - “Latin-Vogul dictionary” (1775), “A short Vogul dictionary with a Russian translation, collected and located on various materials, in the city of Solikamsk and the Holy Trinity Cathedral by Simeon Cherkalov in 1785”, “Comparative dictionaries of all languages ​​​​and dialects, collected by the right hand of the highest person”, compiled by Peter Pallas (1787). In these works, which recorded Mansi words from various dialects, including those that have now disappeared, Cyrillic (more often) and Latin (less often) alphabets were used. In 1864, the first grammar of the Mansi language was published in Pest, compiled by Hunfalvy Pál [hu] (P. Hunfalvy. A. vogul föld és nép. Pest, 1864). In this work, the Latin alphabet was used.

In the 19th century, in connection with the Christianization of the Mansi, book publishing began directly in the Mansi language. The first Mansi book (Konda dialect) was the translation of the Gospel of Matthew, published in London in 1868. Another translation of the Gospel into the Mansi language (in Cyrillic with additional letters ӓ ј ӱ) was published in Helsingfors in 1882. In 1903, the first Mansi primer appeared - "The Alphabet for the Voguls of the Urals", compiled by Bishop Nikanor [ru] in the Pelym dialect. In this primer, the then Russian alphabet was used without changes. All these publications did not receive any distribution among the Mansi.

Latin based alphabet 
In the 1920s, the process of Latinisation of scripts began in the USSR. As part of this project, in 1930-1931, a single Latinized northern alphabet was developed, which was to be used to create writing in the languages of the peoples of the North. According to the original draft, the Mansi alphabet was supposed to look like this: A a, Ç ç, E e, Ə ə, G g, Ƣ ƣ, H h, I i, J j, K k, L l, M m, N n, Ŋ ŋ, O o, P p, R r, S s, Ş ş, T t, U u, V v, W w, Ь ь.

However, in 1931, a slightly modified version of the Latinized Mansi alphabet was approved:

A sub-letter comma denoted palatalization. The length of the vowels was not displayed in the letter.

The first book in this alphabet was the primer "Iļpi ļoŋꜧh". It was followed by other literature, mainly children's and educational, and it also began to be used in the newspaper "Hantь-Maŋꞩi ꞩop" (Ugra news [ru]). The basis of the Mansi literary language was the Sosva dialect, which was spoken by more than 60% of the Mansi and which was the least subject to Russian influence.

Modern alphabet 
In 1937, the Mansi alphabet, like the alphabets of other peoples of the USSR, was translated into Cyrillic. This alphabet included all the letters of the Russian alphabet, as well as the digraph Нг нг, which was considered a separate letter. In the 1950s, the digraph Нг нг was replaced by the letter Ӈ ӈ. In 1979, at the suggestion of Evdokia Rombandeyeva, signs for long vowels were included in the Mansi alphabet (by adding a macron). Prior to that, in 1978, in the publication of Lenin’s brochure “The Tasks of Youth Unions”, an accent mark was used to indicate long vowels. This reform is considered one of the most successful for the writings of the peoples of the North.

Since then, the Mansi alphabet has not changed and now has the following form:

The letters Б б, Г г, Д д, Ж ж, З з, Ф ф, Ц ц, Ч ч, Ш ш are used only in borrowings.

Correspondence chart

References 

Languages of Russia
Uralic languages
Mansi
Cyrillic alphabets